Vicia dumetorum is a species of legume in the vetch genus.

Description
This herbaceous perennial, erect plant is quite rare and variable. It produces stalked clusters with 3-12 bluish-violet flowers. They bloom from May to June.

Distribution
This species is present in Central, Northern and Eastern Europe and in the Western Asia.

Habitat
The name of the species comes from the Latin 'dumetum' (bush, hedge, bush) with reference to the habitat.

References
Sanna Black-Samuelsson and Stefan Andersson - Relationship between Reaction Norm Variation and RAPD Diversity in Vicia dumetorum International Journal of Plant Sciences Vol. 158, No. 5 (Sep., 1997
Biolib
Alien Plants of Belgium
Infoflora

dumet
Flora of Europe
Plants described in 1753
Taxa named by Carl Linnaeus